The Hangover is the fourth studio album by American rapper Obie Trice, released on August 7, 2015 by Black Market Entertainment. The album features guest appearances from Young Buck, Drey Skonie, Estelle and others. The album cover consists of all three of Obie Trice's first three studio album covers: Cheers, Second Round's On Me and Bottoms Up. In a 2016 interview with Mr. Wavvy, Trice revealed that this would be his final album with an alcohol-themed title. It sold 4,960 copies in its first week. It was announced on January 25, 2016 that the album had sold an estimated 7,700 copies, including from streaming services where 1,500 streams equals one album sale.

Singles 
The song "Same Shit" was released on February 15, 2015. The lead single "Good Girl" produced by Grammy Winning Producer Magnedo, was released on June 16, 2015 as a digital download on iTunes. On July 17, 2015 Obie Trice premiered a leak from The Hangover called "Dealer" featuring Young Buck & fellow Detroit rapper Tone Tone.

Track listing

References

2015 albums
Obie Trice albums
Albums produced by Mr. Porter